Etelka Barsi-Pataky (15 September 1941, Budapest – 4 February 2018) was a Hungarian politician.  From 2004 to 2009, she was a Member of the European Parliament (MEP) with Fidesz, part of the European People's Party. She sat on the European Parliament's Committee on Transport and Tourism.

Barsi-Pataky was a substitute for the Committee on Industry, Research and Energy and
a member of the Delegation for relations with South Africa.

Education
 1964: Budapest University of Technology, engineer's certificate
 1980: town planning engineer's certificate

Career
 2010–2011 Government Commissioner for the EU Danube Strategy
 2009–2017 President of the Hungarian Chamber of Engineers
 2004–2009: Member of the European Parliament
 2000–2003: Ambassador to Austria
 1994–1998: Member of the Hungarian Parliament
 1992–1994: Titular Undersecretary of State, Ministry of Economic Affairs
 High Commissioner for the Hungarian Expo
 1992–1994: Chairman of the Council for the Hungarian Expo
 1990–1994: Councillor, Budapest City Council
 1965–1990: Project engineer
 Research fellow
 1991: Principal Private Secretary, Ministry of Transport, Communications and Water Management
 1990–1992: leader, MDF party group on the Council
 1990–1992: Chairman of the Urban Development Committee, Budapest City Council
 1990–1991: Vice-Chairman of the Hungarian Chamber of Engineers

Decorations
 Grand Decoration for Services to the Republic of Austria in Silver with Sash

See also
 2004 European Parliament election in Hungary

References

External links
 
 

1941 births
2018 deaths
Politicians from Budapest
MEPs for Hungary 2004–2009
Women MEPs for Hungary
Fidesz MEPs
Ambassadors of Hungary to Austria
Recipients of the Grand Decoration with Sash for Services to the Republic of Austria
Members of the National Assembly of Hungary (1994–1998)
20th-century Hungarian politicians
20th-century Hungarian women politicians
21st-century Hungarian politicians
Hungarian women diplomats
Hungarian women ambassadors